Cybalomia fractilinealis is a moth in the family Crambidae. It is found in Turkmenistan and Iran.

References

Cybalomiinae
Moths described in 1874